Tonga as a given name or surname may refer to:

Tonga Fifita (born 1959), semi-retired professional wrestler
Tonga Lea'aetoa (born 1977), New Zealand-Tongan rugby union player
Tonga Mahuta (c. 1897 – 1947), New Zealand tribal leader
Lord Tonga Tuʻiʻafitu (born 1962), Tongan clergyman and politician
Charlie Tonga (born 1977), Tongan former professional rugby league footballer, and current coach of the Tongan national team
Esi Tonga (born 1988), Australian rugby league player, brother of Willie Tonga
Khyiris Tonga (born 1996), American football player
Matangi Tonga (American football) (born 1988), American football player
Willie Tonga (born 1983), Australian rugby league player, brother of Esi Tonga

See also

Tona (name)
Tonda (name)
Tonja (name)
Tonka (name)